Ferdinand Van der Auwera (26 November 1929, in Antwerp – 27 October 2015), pseudonym Fernand Auwera is a Belgian writer. His fragile health during his youth and its impact on his life (solitude), had an effect on his first literary work.

Life and work 
He started his career as a civil servant and worked for the journal Volkskrant and the literary magazine Dietsche Warande en Belfort. He made his literary debut with the psychological novel De weddenschap (E: The bet) in (1963). Later he made the statement that he wrote as a therapy, such as with Zelfportret met gesloten ogen (E: Self-portrait with closed eyes) (1973) and Uit het raam springen moet als nutteloos worden beschouwd (E: Jumping out of the window must be considered useless) (1983), which was made into a movie Springen. In Schrijven of schieten (E: Writing or shooting)  (1969) and Geen daden maar woorden (E: No deeds but words) (1970), he published several interviews with fellow writers. In addition he wrote some books for children and literary essays. He contributed to the screenplays of the movies De Witte van Sichem (1980) after Ernest Claes and Lijmen/Het Been (2000) after Willem Elsschot.

Bibliography
 De weddenschap (1963)
 Het manneke en de roestige ridders (1963)
 Het manneke en de zielige zeerovers (?)
 Het manneke en de grimmige goochelaar (?)
 De donderzonen (1964)
 De koning van de bijen (1966)
 Mathias 't kofschip (1967)
 In memoriam A.L. (1968)
 Vogels met rode beulskoppen (1968)
 Schrijven of schieten (1969)
 Geen daden maar woorden (1970)
 Zelfportret met gesloten ogen (1973)
 We beginnen de dag opgeruimd en lopen rond de tafel (1974)
 Piet Van Aken (1974)
 Bloemen verwelken, schepen vergaan... (1976)
 Zonder onderschriften, 'n kleurboek voor volwassenen (1977)
 De nachtridders (1978)
 Ik wou dat ik een marathonloper was (1978)
 Cowboy spelen (1980)
 De Witte van Sichem (filmscenario, 1980)
 Uit het raam springen moet als nutteloos worden beschouwd (1983)
 Huilen met de pet op (1984)
 Mooie, gekwetste ziel (1984)
 Chantage (1985)
 De gnokkel (1985)
 Engagement of escapisme? (1985)
 Het Antwerps kroegenboek (1986)
 De toren van Babel is geen puinhoop (1986)
 Marc Sleen (1987)
 Zeer slordig woordenboek (1987)
 Wachttijd (1989)
 Een duidelijk maar doodlopend spoor (1990)
 Memoires van een afwezige (1982)
 Schrijvers drinken om helder te blijven (1992)
 Tedere schade (1993)
 Cultuurstad Antwerpen (1993)
 De nachten van Andreas Richter (1994)
 Een hart in het lijf (1995)
 De man in de stoel en andere novellen (1996)
 Een hond van Vlaanderen (1996)
 De katten van Krakau (1997)
 Antwerpen centraal (1998)
 Willem Elsschot (1999)
 Lijmen/Het Been (film scenario, 2000)
 Vliegen in een spinneweb (2001)

Awards
 1974 - Arkprijs van het Vrije Woord

See also
 Flemish literature

Sources
 Fernand Auwera (in Dutch)
 Fernand Auwera (in Dutch)
 G.J. van Bork, P.J. Verkruijsse, De Nederlandse en Vlaamse auteurs (1985)

1929 births
2015 deaths
Flemish writers
Ark Prize of the Free Word winners